Westminster is a historic apartment building at 632-640 Hinman Avenue in Evanston, Illinois. The three-story brick building was built in 1912. The building has a U-shaped layout with a wide central courtyard. Architect John A. Nyden, who lived in Evanston and designed several other apartment buildings in the city, designed the Prairie School building. The building's design features limestone banding, arched entrances, wood mullions on the windows, and a hipped roof with a bracketed cornice.

The building was added to the National Register of Historic Places on March 15, 1984.

References

External links

Buildings and structures on the National Register of Historic Places in Cook County, Illinois
Residential buildings on the National Register of Historic Places in Illinois
Buildings and structures in Evanston, Illinois
Apartment buildings in Illinois
Prairie School architecture in Illinois
Residential buildings completed in 1912